Charles Blalock Smith (February 6, 1931 – March 16, 2011) was an American amateur golfer. He played in the 1961 and 1963 Walker Cup matches.

Golf career
Smith played college golf at The Citadel, The Military College of South Carolina, graduating in 1952. He was inducted into The Citadel Hall of Fame in 1985.

Smith had considerable success as an amateur in the early 1960s. He represented the United States in the Walker Cup in 1961 and 1963 and also in the Americas Cup in 1961. He won a number of important amateur tournaments, including the Azalea Invitational, Carolinas Open, North and South Men's Amateur Golf Championship, Eastern Amateur, Southern Amateur, and Carolinas Amateur. He played in the Masters four times and twice in the U.S. Open, although he missed the cut on all six occasions. He reached the quarter-finals of the U.S. Amateur in 1961 and 1964.

Personal life
Smith served in the US Air Force. His brother Dave was also a successful amateur golfer, winning the Azalea Invitational and the Carolinas Amateur.

Amateur wins
1948 Donald Ross Junior Championship
1952 South Carolina Intercollegiate
1958 Azalea Invitational
1960 Carolinas Open, North and South Men's Amateur Golf Championship, Southern Amateur
1962 Eastern Amateur, Carolinas Amateur
1964 Azalea Invitational

Results in major championships

Note: Smith never played in The Open Championship or the PGA Championship.

CUT = missed the half-way cut

U.S. national team appearances
Amateur
Walker Cup: 1961 (winners), 1963 (winners)
Americas Cup: 1961 (winners)

References

American male golfers
Amateur golfers
The Citadel Bulldogs men's golfers
People from Gastonia, North Carolina
1931 births
2011 deaths